Dornoch Castle is situated opposite Dornoch Cathedral in the town of Dornoch, in Sutherland, Scotland, a little over  north of Inverness.

As of 2021, the castle was operated as a family-run hotel with 24 rooms.

History
Dornoch Castle was built around 1500 as the home of the bishops of Caithness. Bishop Robert Stewart gifted the castle to John Gordon, 11th Earl of Sutherland in 1557. In 1570 the castle was set alight in a feud between the McKays and Murrays. The rebuilding which followed included the addition of the upper part of the tower. The castle decayed during the 18th century, but was restored in 1813–1814 to serve as a school and jail. In 1859-60 it became a court house, and was made the headquarters of the Sheriff of Sutherland with extensive remodelling by William Fowler.

Further alterations were made around 1880, including the heightening of the south-west block, and the addition of a three-storey east tower. Following the restoration the castle became a hunting lodge for visiting sportsmen. In 1947 it became a hotel. The Dornoch Castle Hotel has 24 rooms, including suites, and garden rooms, which were built in the 1970s. In addition, there are several personalized rooms and a restaurant. The castle is a category B listed building.
The Castle is believed to have been haunted by the ghost of  Andrew McCornish who was hanged for sheep stealing.

The building passed into private hands in 1922, and became a hotel in 1947. It is now the Dornoch Castle Hotel.

References

External links

Dornoch Castle Hotel

Castles in Highland (council area)
Clan Sutherland
Category B listed buildings in Highland (council area)
Listed castles in Scotland
Reportedly haunted locations in Scotland
Buildings and structures in Sutherland
Dornoch